Ghana competed at the 2011 World Championships in Athletics from August 27 to September 4 in Daegu, South Korea.

Team selection

A team of 7 athletes was announced to represent the country in the event.  The team was led by 2005 World Championships heptathlon bronze medalist Margaret Simpson.

The following athlete appeared on the preliminary Entry List, but not on the Official Start List of the specific event, resulting in total number of 6 competitors:

Results

Men
In the men's 100 metres heats on August 27, 2011, Aziz Zakari placed 6th in the race with a time of 10.55 seconds. He could thus not advance to the next round. His ranking at the heats stage was 35.

Ignisious Gaisah competed in the Long jump heats on 2 September 2011. His best jump of 7.92m meant he ranked 17th, falling outside the top 12 who qualified for the final.

The men's 4x100 metres relay is scheduled to take part in heat 1 on September 4, 2011.

Women
Heptathlon

Margaret Simpson was Ghana's sole female competitor at the games. She placed 14th in the heptathlon with 6183 points.

References

External links
Official local organising committee website
Official IAAF competition website

Nations at the 2011 World Championships in Athletics
World Championships in Athletics
2011